Anarcho-punk (also known as anarchist punk or peace punk) is ideological subgenre of punk rock that promotes anarchism. Some use the term broadly to refer to any punk music with anarchist lyrical content, which may figure in crust punk, hardcore punk, folk punk, and other styles.

History

Before 1977 
Some members of the 1960s protopunk bands such as the MC5, The Fugs, Hawkwind, and the Edgar Broughton Band had new left or anarchist ideology. These bands set a precedent for mixing radical politics with rock music and established the idea of rock as an agent of social and political change in the public consciousness. Other precursors to anarcho-punk include avant-garde art and political movements such as Fluxus, Dada, the Beat generation, England's angry young men (such as Joe Orton), the surrealism-inspired Situationist International, the May 1968 uprising in Paris, and the Campaign for Nuclear Disarmament. Jello Biafra of the Dead Kennedys has cited the Yippies as an influence on his activism and thinking.

Post 1977 
A surge of popular interest in anarchism occurred during the 1970s in the United Kingdom following the birth of punk rock, in particular the Situationist-influenced graphics of Sex Pistols artist Jamie Reid, as well as that band's first single, "Anarchy in the U.K.". Crass and the Poison Girls funded the rented Wapping Autonomy Centre with a benefit single and this then inspired other squatted self-managed social centres in London such as the Ambulance Station on Old Kent Road, Centro Iberico, Molly's Café on Upper Street and the Bingo Hall opposite Highbury & Islington station (now the Garage). The concept (and aesthetics) of anarcho-punk was quickly picked up on by bands like Flux of Pink Indians, Subhumans and Conflict.

The early 1980s saw the emergence of the Leeds anarcho-punk scene with groups like Abrasive Wheels, The Expelled and Icon A.D. From this scene came Chumbawamba, whose emphasis on confrontational political activism soon overtook their connection to the scene. Despite their anti-corporate views, the group signed to EMI, leading to their 1997 single Tubthumping number 2 on the UK Singles Chart.

Pioneering crust punk bands Antisect, Anti System, Sacrilege and Amebix all began in the anarcho-punk scene, before incorporating their anarchist lyrical themes with elements of early heavy metal. Early British grindcore bands like Carcass, Napalm Death and Extreme Noise Terror were primarily a part of the 1980s anarcho-punk scene, however began embracing elements of extreme metal and American thrashcore.

United States 
Anarcho-punk spread to the United States in the late 1970s with groups like Austin's MDC and San Francisco's Dead Kennedys. Los Angeles' Black Flag also embraced anarchists politics between 1982 and 1986, when Henry Rollins was their vocalist. United States anarcho-punk generally supported revolutions in Latin America and anti-Apartheid movements and criticized the Presidency of Ronald Reagan.

In the 1980s, New York City cultivated a thriving anarcho-punk scene. Beginning as a part of the larger New York hardcore scene, bands like Reagan Youth, False Prophets and Heart Attack made use of a similar musical style and mentality to their British counterparts. This scene split from New York hardcore as the decade progressed. Nausea were a key figure in the scene during this period, helping to cultivate a new scene in the city based around politics and squatting.

In the 2000s, American anarcho-punk groups like Anti-Flag and Against Me gained significant mainstream success for the genre.

Ideology 

Anarcho-punk bands often disassociated themselves from established anarchist currents like collectivist anarchism, anarcho-syndicalism or anarcho-communism. Because of this, as well as their emphasis on pacifism, the scene was generally independent of the wider anarchist movement at the time. Bands generally supported animal rights, anti-corporatism, labor rights and the anti-war movement.

Anarcho-punks have criticized the flaws of the punk movement and the wider youth culture. Bands like Crass and Dead Kennedys have written songs that attack corporate co-option of the punk subculture, people who are deemed to have sold out, and the violence between punks, skinheads, B-boys, other youth subcultures, and within punk itself. Some anarcho-punks are straight edge, claiming that alcohol, tobacco, drugs and promiscuity are instruments of oppression and are self-destructive because they cloud the mind and wear down a person's resistance to other types of oppression. Some also condemn the waste of land, water and resources necessary to grow crops to make alcohol, tobacco and drugs, forfeiting the potential to grow and manufacture food. Some may be straight edge for religious reasons, such as in the case of Christian, Muslim, and Buddhist anarcho-punks (see Anarchism and religion for more background).

Although Crass initially espoused pacifism, this is not necessarily the case for all anarcho-punks. Despite the broader punk subculture's antagonism towards hippies, the ideals of the hippie counterculture were an influence on anarcho-punk. Crass were explicit regarding their associations with the hippie counterculture, and this influence has also carried over to crust punk.

Direct action
Anarcho-punks universally believe in direct action, although the way in which this manifests itself varies greatly. Despite their differences in strategy, anarcho-punks often co-operate with each other. Many anarcho-punks are pacifists (e.g. Crass and Discharge) and therefore believe in using non-violent means of achieving their aims. These include nonviolent resistance, refusal of work, squatting, economic sabotage, dumpster diving, graffiti, culture jamming, ecotage, freeganism, boycotting, civil disobedience, hacktivism and subvertising. Some anarcho-punks believe that violence or property damage is an acceptable way of achieving social change (e.g. Conflict). This manifests itself as rioting, vandalism, wire cutting, hunt sabotage, participation in Animal Liberation Front, Earth Liberation Front, or even Black Bloc style activities, and in extreme cases, bombings. Many anarchists dispute the applicability of the term "violence" to describe destruction of property, since they argue that destruction of property is done not to control an individual or institution but to take its control away.

DIY punk ethic
Many anarcho-punk bands subscribe to a "do-it-yourself" (DIY) ethic. A popular anarcho-punk slogan is "DIY not EMI," a conscious rejection of a major record company. Many anarcho-punk bands were showcased on the Bullshit Detector series of LPs released by Crass Records and Resistance Productions between 1980 and 1994. Some anarcho-punk performers were part of the cassette culture. This allowed artists to bypass the traditional recording and distribution routes, with recordings often being made available in exchange for a blank tape and a self-addressed envelope. The anarcho-punk movement has its own network of fanzines, punk zines, and self-published books which disseminate news, ideas and artwork from the scene. These are DIY productions, tending to be produced in runs of hundreds at most. The 'zines are printed on photocopiers or duplicator machines, and distributed by hand at punk concerts, in radical bookstores and infoshops, and through the mail.

Musical style and aesthetics 
Anarcho-punk bands are often less focused on particular musical delivery and more focused on a totalized aesthetic that encompasses the entire creative process, from album and concert art, to political message, and to the lifestyles of the band members. Crass listed as band members the people who did their album art and live visuals. The message is considered to be more important than the music. According to the punk aesthetic, one can express oneself and produce moving and serious works with limited means and technical ability. It is not uncommon for anarcho-punk songs to lack the usual rock structure of verses and a chorus, however, there are exceptions to this. For example, later Chumbawamba songs were at the same time anarcho-punk and pop-oriented.

Bands such as Crass, Conflict, Nausea and Chumbawamba make use of both male and female vocalists.

See also 

Anarchism and the arts
Anarchist symbolism
Animal rights and punk subculture
Crust punk
Red and Anarchist Skinheads
Punk ideologies
List of anarcho-punk bands
List of anarchist musicians
List of subcultures

References

Bibliography

 Geoff Eley - "Do It Yourself Politics (DIY)", Forging Democracy: The History of the Left in Europe, 1850-2000, chapter 27: "The Center and the Margins: Decline or Renewal?." Oxford University Press, 2002.  p. 476-481.
 Ian Glasper - The Day the Country Died: A History of Anarcho Punk 1980 to 1984 (Cherry Red publishing, 2006 )
 Craig O'Hara - Philosophy of Punk: More Than Noise (AK Press, 1999 )
 George Berger - The Story of Crass (London: Omnibus Press 2006)

Further reading

External links

A critical look at anarcho-punk Links to a series of articles and interviews on the subject.
Crass Documentary Trailers & download
What is Anarchist Music? by Ruud Noys

 
Punk rock genres
Anarchist culture
Activism
British styles of music
Political music genres
British rock music genres
Cassette culture 1970s–1990s